Mofida Ahmed (1921-2008) was an Indian politician belonging to the Indian National Congress. She was Assam's first female Member of Parliament, Lok Sabha and also one of the first few Muslim women to be a Member of Parliament in India.

Early life and education 
She was born in Jorhat Town to Md. Barua Ali in November 1921. She pursued her education privately. Later in life, she contributed articles to Assamese journals. Her works include Biswadip-Bapuji and Bharatar-Nehru.

Career 
Ahmed worked for the National Savings Scheme in an honorary capacity (14-7-55 to 19-1-57), as a Joint Secretary at Red Cross Society, Jorhat (1946–1949). She was also the Convener of The Women's department of the Congress at Golaghat since its inception in 1953 to the end of 1956. She also served as the assistant Secretary at Tezpur District to the Mahila Samiti (October 1951 to January 1953) at maternity welfare for rescue of fallen women.

Personal life 
She married Asanuddin Ahmed on 11 December 1940. She liked reading, knitting, sewing and gardening . She died at the age of 88 on 17 January 2008 following old age ailments.

References 

Indian National Congress politicians from Assam
Women members of the Lok Sabha
India MPs 1957–1962
Lok Sabha members from Assam
1921 births
People from Jorhat district
2008 deaths